Prince Rupert was a provincial electoral district in the Canadian province of British Columbia.  It made its first appearance on the hustings in the election of 1916 and its last in the 1986 election.  Its main successor ridings are North Coast and Skeena.

Notable MLAs

The first electoral race in this riding is its most significant - the electoral debut of Thomas Dufferin "Duff" Pattullo, 22nd Premier of British Columbia, 1933-1941.

Political geography

Members of the Legislative Assembly

Election results 

|-

|Liberal
|Thomas Dufferin Pattullo
|align="right"|1,062 	
|align="right"|52.89%
|align="right"|
|align="right"|unknown

|- bgcolor="white"
!align="right" colspan=3|Total valid votes
!align="right"|2,008 
!align="right"|100.00%
!align="right"|
|- bgcolor="white"
!align="right" colspan=3|Total rejected ballots
!align="right"|
!align="right"|
!align="right"|
|- bgcolor="white"
!align="right" colspan=3|Turnout
!align="right"|%
!align="right"|
!align="right"|
|}

|-

|Liberal
|Thomas Dufferin Pattullo
|align="right"|1,501 	
|align="right"|43.70%
|align="right"|
|align="right"|unknown

|- bgcolor="white"
!align="right" colspan=3|Total valid votes
!align="right"|3,435 
!align="right"|100.00%
!align="right"|
|- bgcolor="white"
!align="right" colspan=3|Total rejected ballots
!align="right"|
!align="right"|
!align="right"|
|- bgcolor="white"
!align="right" colspan=3|Turnout
!align="right"|%
!align="right"|
!align="right"|
|- bgcolor="white"
!align="right" colspan=7|1  Endorsed by FLP but ran on SPC platform.
|}

|Liberal
|Thomas Dufferin Pattullo
|align="right"|920 		
|align="right"|55.89%
|align="right"|
|align="right"|unknown

|- bgcolor="white"
!align="right" colspan=3|Total valid votes
!align="right"|1,646
!align="right"|100.00%
|- bgcolor="white"
!align="right" colspan=7|2  Endorsed by Conservative Party.
|}	  	  	

|-

|Liberal
|Thomas Dufferin Pattullo
|align="right"|1,370 	
|align="right"|51.78%
|align="right"|
|align="right"|unknown

|- bgcolor="white"
!align="right" colspan=3|Total valid votes
!align="right"|2,646
!align="right"|100.00%
!align="right"|
|- bgcolor="white"
!align="right" colspan=3|Total rejected ballots
!align="right"|60
!align="right"|
!align="right"|
|- bgcolor="white"
!align="right" colspan=3|Turnout
!align="right"|80.28%
!align="right"|
!align="right"|
|}

|-

|Liberal
|Thomas Dufferin Pattullo
|align="right"|1,725 	
|align="right"|64.90%
|align="right"|
|align="right"|unknown

|Co-operative Commonwealth Fed.
|George Weston Rudderham
|align="right"|665 	
|align="right"|25.02%
|align="right"|
|align="right"|unknown

|- bgcolor="white"
!align="right" colspan=3|Total valid votes
!align="right"|2,658
!align="right"|100.00%
!align="right"|
|- bgcolor="white"
!align="right" colspan=3|Total rejected ballots
!align="right"|70
!align="right"|
!align="right"|
|- bgcolor="white"
!align="right" colspan=3|Turnout
!align="right"|66.29%
!align="right"|
!align="right"|
|} 	  	  	  	

|-

|Liberal
|Thomas Dufferin Pattullo 
|align="right"|1,446 	
|align="right"|49.55%
|align="right"|
|align="right"|unknown

|Co-operative Commonwealth Fed.
|George William Weaver
|align="right"|796 	
|align="right"|27.28%
|align="right"|
|align="right"|unknown

|BC Social Credit League
|Robert Purvis Armstrong 
|align="right"|14 	
|align="right"|0.48%
|align="right"|
|align="right"|unknown
|- bgcolor="white"
!align="right" colspan=3|Total valid votes
!align="right"|2,918
!align="right"|100.00%
!align="right"|
|- bgcolor="white"
!align="right" colspan=3|Total rejected ballots
!align="right"|83
!align="right"|
!align="right"|
|- bgcolor="white"
!align="right" colspan=3|Turnout
!align="right"|%
!align="right"|
!align="right"|
|}

|-

|Liberal
|Thomas Dufferin Pattullo 
|align="right"|1,681 	
|align="right"|51.82%
|align="right"|
|align="right"|unknown

|Co-operative Commonwealth Fed.
|George William Weaver
|align="right"|1,563 	
|align="right"|48.18%
|align="right"|
|align="right"|unknown
|- bgcolor="white"
!align="right" colspan=3|Total valid votes
!align="right"|3,244 
!align="right"|100.00%
!align="right"|
|- bgcolor="white"
!align="right" colspan=3|Total rejected ballots
!align="right"|96
!align="right"|
!align="right"|
|- bgcolor="white"
!align="right" colspan=3|Turnout
!align="right"|%
!align="right"|
!align="right"|
|}

|-

|Co-operative Commonwealth Fed.
|William Henry Brett
|align="right"|1,873 	
|align="right"|49.83%
|align="right"|
|align="right"|unknown

|Independent
|Thomas Dufferin Pattullo 3
|align="right"|1,348 	
|align="right"|35.86%
|align="right"|
|align="right"|unknown

|- bgcolor="white"
!align="right" colspan=3|Total valid votes
!align="right"|3,759
!align="right"|100.00%
!align="right"|
|- bgcolor="white"
!align="right" colspan=3|Total rejected ballots
!align="right"|52
!align="right"|
!align="right"|
|- bgcolor="white"
!align="right" colspan=3|Turnout
!align="right"|63.19%
!align="right"|
!align="right"|
|- bgcolor="white"
!align="right" colspan=7|3  T.D. Pattullo (Prince Rupert) former premier and Liberal Party leader ran as a straight Independent and is included as such.
|}

|-

|Co-operative Commonwealth Fed.
|William Henry Brett
|align="right"|2,296 		
|align="right"|43.59%
|align="right"|
|align="right"|unknown
|- bgcolor="white"
!align="right" colspan=3|Total valid votes
!align="right"|5,267
!align="right"|100.00%
!align="right"|
|- bgcolor="white"
!align="right" colspan=3|Total rejected ballots
!align="right"|53
!align="right"|
!align="right"|
|- bgcolor="white"
!align="right" colspan=3|Turnout
!align="right"|%
!align="right"|
!align="right"|
|}

|-

|Co-operative Commonwealth Fed.
|George Edwin Hills
|align="right"|2,292             
|align="right"|37.67% 
|align="right"|2,903  
|align="right"|51.32%
|align="right"|
|align="right"|unknown

|Liberal
|John Duncan McRae
|align="right"|2,001     	
|align="right"|32.89%
|align="right"|2,754 
|align="right"|48.68
|align="right"|
|align="right"|unknown

|Progressive Conservative
|Thomas Melbourne Christie
|align="right"|687      
|align="right"|11.29%
|align="right"| -   
|align="right"| -.- %
|align="right"|
|align="right"|unknown
|- bgcolor="white"
!align="right" colspan=3|Total valid votes
!align="right"|6,084              
!align="right"|100.00%
!align="right"|5,657 
!align="right"|%
!align="right"|
|- bgcolor="white"
!align="right" colspan=3|Total rejected ballots
!align="right"|153
!align="right"|
!align="right"|
|- bgcolor="white"
!align="right" colspan=3|Turnout
!align="right"|%
!align="right"|
!align="right"|
|- bgcolor="white"
!align="right" colspan=9|4 Preferential ballot; final count is between top two candidates from first count; intermediary counts (of 4) not shown.
|}	  	 	 

|-

|Liberal
|Arthur Bruce Brown 
|align="right"|1,864 	 			 	 	     
|align="right"|32.88% 
|align="right"|2,611 
|align="right"|50.32% 
|align="right"|
|align="right"|unknown

|Co-operative Commonwealth Fed.
|George Edwin Hills  	 	 	
|align="right"|2,074 	 	 	       
|align="right"|36.59% 
|align="right"|2,578  
|align="right"|49.68%
|align="right"|
|align="right"|unknown

|- bgcolor="white"
!align="right" colspan=3|Total valid votes
!align="right"|5,669 	  	  	       
!align="right"|100.00%
!align="right"|5,189	  
!align="right"|%
!align="right"|
|- bgcolor="white"
!align="right" colspan=3|Total rejected ballots
!align="right"|299 
!align="right"|
!align="right"|
!align="right"|
!align="right"|
|- bgcolor="white"
!align="right" colspan=3|Total Registered Voters
!align="right"|
!align="right"|
!align="right"|
!align="right"|
!align="right"|
|- bgcolor="white"
!align="right" colspan=3|Turnout
!align="right"|%
!align="right"|
!align="right"|
!align="right"|
!align="right"|
|- bgcolor="white"
!align="right" colspan=9|5  Preferential ballot; final count is between top two candidates from first count; intermediary counts (of 2) not shown.
|}

|-

|Liberal
|Arthur Bruce Brown
|align="right"|1,664 	
|align="right"|32.79%
|align="right"|
|align="right"|unknown

|Co-operative Commonwealth Fed.
|George Edwin Hills
|align="right"|1,259 	
|align="right"|24.81%
|align="right"|
|align="right"|unknown
|- bgcolor="white"
!align="right" colspan=3|Total valid votes
!align="right"|5,074 
!align="right"|100.00%
!align="right"|
|- bgcolor="white"
!align="right" colspan=3|Total rejected ballots
!align="right"|83
!align="right"|
!align="right"|
|- bgcolor="white"
!align="right" colspan=3|Turnout
!align="right"|%
!align="right"|
!align="right"|
|}

|-

|Co-operative Commonwealth Fed.
|Angus MacPhee
|align="right"|2,139 		
|align="right"|36.93%
|align="right"|
|align="right"|unknown

|Liberal
|Arthur Bruce Brown
|align="right"|1,087 		
|align="right"|18.77%
|align="right"|
|align="right"|unknown

|Progressive Conservative
|Horace L.G. Kelly
|align="right"|199 	
|align="right"|3.44%
|align="right"|
|align="right"|unknown
|- bgcolor="white"
!align="right" colspan=3|Total valid votes
!align="right"|5,792
!align="right"|100.00%
!align="right"|
|- bgcolor="white"
!align="right" colspan=3|Total rejected ballots
!align="right"|134
!align="right"|
!align="right"|
|- bgcolor="white"
!align="right" colspan=3|Turnout
!align="right"|%
!align="right"|
!align="right"|
|}

|-

|Liberal
|Neil Fergus MacDonald
|align="right"|1,328 	
|align="right"|23.70%
|align="right"|
|align="right"|unknown
|- bgcolor="white"
!align="right" colspan=3|Total valid votes
!align="right"|5,603 
!align="right"|100.00%
!align="right"|
|- bgcolor="white"
!align="right" colspan=3|Total rejected ballots
!align="right"|59
!align="right"|
!align="right"|
|- bgcolor="white"
!align="right" colspan=3|Turnout
!align="right"|%
!align="right"|
!align="right"|
|}	  	  	  	

|-

|Liberal
|Neil Fergus MacDonald
|align="right"|544 	 	
|align="right"|10.87%
|align="right"|
|align="right"|unknown
|- bgcolor="white"
!align="right" colspan=3|Total valid votes
!align="right"|5,004 	
!align="right"|100.00%
!align="right"|
|- bgcolor="white"
!align="right" colspan=3|Total rejected ballots
!align="right"|34
!align="right"|
!align="right"|
|- bgcolor="white"
!align="right" colspan=3|Turnout
!align="right"|%
!align="right"|
!align="right"|
|}  	  	  	 

|-

|Liberal
|Peter James Lester
|align="right"|1,488 	 	
|align="right"|19.79%
|align="right"|
|align="right"|unknown

|Independent
|Roderick Douglas Falconer
|align="right"|64 		 	
|align="right"|0.85%
|align="right"|
|align="right"|unknown
|- bgcolor="white"
!align="right" colspan=3|Total valid votes
!align="right"|7,519 	
!align="right"|100.00%
!align="right"|
|- bgcolor="white"
!align="right" colspan=3|Total rejected ballots
!align="right"|94
!align="right"|
!align="right"|
|- bgcolor="white"
!align="right" colspan=3|Turnout
!align="right"|%
!align="right"|
!align="right"|
|}  	

|-

|Liberal
|Odd Inge Eidsvik
|align="right"|1,416 	 	 	
|align="right"|18.71%
|align="right"|
|align="right"|unknown

|Independent
|Robert Graham Porter
|align="right"|287 	 		 	
|align="right"|3.79%
|align="right"|
|align="right"|unknown
|- bgcolor="white"
!align="right" colspan=3|Total valid votes
!align="right"|7,570  	
!align="right"|100.00%
!align="right"|
|- bgcolor="white"
!align="right" colspan=3|Total rejected ballots
!align="right"|103
!align="right"|
!align="right"|
|- bgcolor="white"
!align="right" colspan=3|Turnout
!align="right"|%
!align="right"|
!align="right"|
|}  	

|-

|Liberal
|Charles Michael Emes
|align="right"|428 	 	 	 	
|align="right"|5.12%
|align="right"|
|align="right"|unknown
|- bgcolor="white"
!align="right" colspan=3|Total valid votes
!align="right"|8,367 	
!align="right"|100.00%
!align="right"|
|- bgcolor="white"
!align="right" colspan=3|Total rejected ballots
!align="right"|78
!align="right"|
!align="right"|
|- bgcolor="white"
!align="right" colspan=3|Turnout
!align="right"|%
!align="right"|
!align="right"|
|}

|-

|- bgcolor="white"
!align="right" colspan=3|Total valid votes
!align="right"|8,300	
!align="right"|100.00%
!align="right"|
|- bgcolor="white"
!align="right" colspan=3|Total rejected ballots
!align="right"|147
!align="right"|
!align="right"|
|- bgcolor="white"
!align="right" colspan=3|Turnout
!align="right"|%
!align="right"|
!align="right"|
|}   	  	

|-

|Liberal
|James Grant Carr
|align="right"|745 	 	 	 	
|align="right"|7.19%
|align="right"|
|align="right"|unknown
|- bgcolor="white"
!align="right" colspan=3|Total valid votes
!align="right"|10,353 	
!align="right"|100.00%
!align="right"|
|- bgcolor="white"
!align="right" colspan=3|Total rejected ballots
!align="right"|160
!align="right"|
!align="right"|
|- bgcolor="white"
!align=";right" colspan=3|Turnout
!align="right"|%
!align="right"|
!align="right"|
|}   	  	

|-

|Liberal
|John D. Whyte
|align="right"|320 	 	 	 	 	
|align="right"|3.25%
|align="right"|
|align="right"|unknown
|- bgcolor="white"
!align="right" colspan=3|Total valid votes
!align="right"|9,861 	
!align="right"|100.00%
!align="right"|
|- bgcolor="white"
!align="right" colspan=3|Total rejected ballots
!align="right"|214
!align="right"|
!align="right"|
|- bgcolor="white"
!align="right" colspan=3|Turnout
!align="right"|%
!align="right"|
!align="right"|
|}   	  	

The Prince Rupert riding was redistributed after the 1986 election.  Successor ridings are:

 North Coast
 Skeena
 Bulkley Valley-Stikine

Sources

Elections BC website - historical election data

Former provincial electoral districts of British Columbia